Abraham "Whitey" Friedman (c. 1897 – April 25, 1939) was a New York mobster and former associate of Nathan "Kid Dropper" Kaplan and later for labor racketeers Louis "Lepke" Buchalter and Jacob "Gurrah" Shapiro as an enforcer in New York's garment district during the 1920s and 1930s. One of many former associates killed by Murder, Inc. on the orders of Buchalter, he had recently been called in for questioning by investigators with crusading District Attorney Thomas E. Dewey, and was gunned down as he was walking near his home on East 96th Street in Brooklyn during the early evening of April 25, 1939. Before his murder, Friedman was suspected of informing on Buchalter.

References

Further reading
Block, Alan A. East Side-West Side: Organizing Crime in New York, 1930–1950. New Brunswick, New Jersey: Transaction Publishers, 1983. 
Fried, Albert. The Rise and Fall of the Jewish Gangster in America. New York: Holt, Rinehart and Winston, 1980. 

1890s births
1937 deaths
Murdered Jewish American gangsters
People murdered by Murder, Inc.
Deaths by firearm in Manhattan
People murdered in New York City
Male murder victims
20th-century American Jews